Eugen Adam (22 January 1817, in Munich – 6 June 1880) was a German painter.

He specialised on animal, genre, landscape and battle paintings. He had his atelier in Munich, and lived in Milan during the years 1849–1858. In 1859 he became war reporter for the journal Ueber Land und Meer. In 1861 he participated in Swiss campaigns, in 1870 and 1871 in the war between France and Germany.

His father Albrecht and brothers Julius, Franz and Benno were also painters.

See also
 List of German painters

Sources
 Allgemeine Deutsche Biographie - online version at Wikisource

1817 births
1880 deaths
Artists from Munich
19th-century German painters
19th-century German male artists
German male painters